Egoi was a minor divinity among the Basques associated with the south wind. Egoi created windstorms.

References
 Jose Miguel de Barandiaran, obras completas. Egilea, Jose Miguel de Barandiaran. Argitaletxea, Editorial la gran enciclopedia vasca, Bilbao 1976.
 "Pequeño diccionario de mitologia vasca y pirenaica". Egilea Olivier de Marliave. Argitaletxea, Alejandria, Barcelona 1995.

Basque gods
Wind deities
Basque mythology